The Bastian Islands are a group of islands in Hinlopen Strait, Svalbard. The islands are located southeast of Wilhelm Island.

The islands are named after German explorer Adolf Bastian. The Bastian Islands are the northern islands of a larger group, and the southern islands of this group are called the Rønnbeck Islands.

References

Islands of Svalbard